The Kitakyushu Kinen (in Japanese: 北九州記念), short for TV Nishinippon Corp. Sho Kitakyushu Kinen, is a Grade III Handicap race for fillies and mares in the JRA.

Race Details
The first race was held in 1966. 

The race is usually held in August, though in the past, they have been run in July.

Foreign horses are allowed to run, with up to 9 foreign horses at a time being allowed to run.

There are no weight limits.

Winners since 2014

Previous Winners

See also
 Horse racing in Japan
 List of Japanese flat horse races

References

Horse races in Japan